Windsor Castle is an unincorporated community in Windsor Township in Berks County, Pennsylvania, United States. Windsor Castle is located at the intersection of Windsor Castle Road, Haas Road, and Zion Church Road.

References

Unincorporated communities in Berks County, Pennsylvania
Unincorporated communities in Pennsylvania